Closed list describes the variant of party-list systems where voters can effectively only vote for political parties as a whole; thus they have no influence on the party-supplied order in which party candidates are elected. If voters had some influence, that would be called an open list. Closed list systems are still commonly used in party-list proportional representation, and most mixed electoral systems also use closed lists in their party list component. Many countries, however have changed their electoral systems to use open lists to incorporate personalised representation to their proportional systems.

In closed list systems, each political party has pre-decided who will receive the seats allocated to that party in the elections, so that the candidates positioned highest on this list tend to always get a seat in the parliament while the candidates positioned very low on the closed list will not. However, the candidates "at the water mark" of a given party are in the position of either losing or winning their seat depending on the number of votes the party gets. "The water mark" is the number of seats a specific party can be expected to achieve. The number of seats that the party wins, combined with the candidates' positions on the party's list, will then determine whether a particular candidate will get a seat.

List of countries using closed list systems

Proportional representation 

  Algeria
  Angola
  Argentina
  Armenia
  Benin
  Burkina Faso
  Burundi
  Cambodia
  Colombia (depending on the party)
  Costa Rica
  Dominican Republic
  East Timor
  Equatorial Guinea
  Guatemala
  Guinea-Bissau
  Guyana
  Hong Kong (1997-2016)
  Israel
  Kazakhstan
  Kyrgyzstan
  Lithuania (1992-1997) (Seimas and munipalities' councils)
  Moldova
  Montenegro
  Morocco
  Mozambique
  Namibia
  Nicaragua
  Niger
  North Macedonia
  Paraguay
  Portugal
  Romania
  Rwanda
  Serbia
  South Africa
  Spain
  Sri Lanka
  Togo
  Tunisia
  Turkey
  Uruguay

Mixed electoral systems 
Mixed electoral system using closed lists for the proportional component
  Andorra
  Hungary
  Germany (mixed-member proportional representation)
  Italy
  New Zealand (mixed-member proportional representation)
 Russia
  Scotland
  Taiwan
 Wales

Majoritarian representation 
Party block voting (general ticket) with a closed list

  Côte d'Ivoire  (party block voting in multi-member districts)
  Singapore (party block voting in multi-member districts)
  United States (electoral college)

See also
 Ley de Lemas
 List of democracy and elections-related topics
 Sekihairitsu
 Zweitmandat

References

External links
 Country profiles at IFES
 Open, Closed and Free Lists at Ace Project

Party-list proportional representation